In ecology, alpha diversity (α-diversity) is the mean species diversity in a site at a local scale. The term was introduced by R. H. Whittaker together with the terms beta diversity (β-diversity) and gamma diversity (γ-diversity). Whittaker's idea was that the total species diversity in a landscape (gamma diversity) is determined by two different things, the mean species diversity in sites at a more local scale (alpha diversity) and the differentiation among those sites (beta diversity).

Scale considerations
Both the area or landscape of interest and the sites within it may be of very different sizes in different situations, and no consensus has been reached on what spatial scales are appropriate to quantify alpha diversity. It has therefore been proposed that the definition of alpha diversity does not need to be tied to a specific spatial scale: alpha diversity can be measured for an existing dataset that consists of subunits at any scale. The subunits can be, for example, sampling units that were already used in the field when carrying out the inventory, or grid cells that are delimited just for the purpose of analysis. If results are extrapolated beyond the actual observations, it needs to be taken into account that the species diversity in the subunits generally gives an underestimation of the species diversity in larger areas.

Different concepts
Ecologists have used several slightly different definitions of alpha diversity. Whittaker himself used the term both for the species diversity in a single subunit and for the mean species diversity in a collection of subunits. It has been argued that defining alpha diversity as a mean across all relevant subunits is preferable, because it agrees better with Whittaker's idea that total species diversity consists of alpha and beta components.

Definitions of alpha diversity can also differ in what they assume species diversity to be. Often researchers use the values given by one or more diversity indices, such as species richness (which is simply a count of species), the Shannon index or the Simpson index (which take into account also species proportional abundances). However, it has been argued that it would be better to use the effective number of species as the universal measure of species diversity. This measure allows weighting rare and abundant species in different ways, just as the diversity indices collectively do, but its meaning is intuitively easier to understand. The effective number of species is the number of equally-abundant species needed to obtain the same mean proportional species abundance as that observed in the dataset of interest (where all species may not be equally abundant).

Calculation
Suppose species diversity is equated with the effective number of species, and alpha diversity with the mean species diversity per subunit. Then alpha diversity can be calculated in two different ways that give the same result. The first approach is to calculate a weighted generalized mean of the within-subunit species proportional abundances, and then take the inverse of this mean. The second approach is to calculate the species diversity for each subunit separately, and then take a weighted generalized mean of these.

If the first approach is used, the equation is:

In the equation, N is the total number of subunits and S is the total number of species (species richness) in the dataset. The denominator hence equals mean proportional species abundance within the subunits (mean ) as calculated with the weighted generalized mean with exponent q - 1.

If the second approach is used, the equation is:

This also equals a weighted generalized mean but with exponent 1 - q. Here the mean is taken of the qDαj values, each of which represents the effective species density (species diversity per subunit) in one subunit j.

Large values of q lead to smaller alpha diversity than small values of q, because increasing q increases the effective weight given to those species with the highest proportional abundance and to those subunits with the lowest species diversity.

Examples
Alpha diversity can be calculated in both extinct and extant landscapes.

Examples of extinct alpha diversity studies
The survival of amphibians and reptiles communities through the Permian-Triassic Extinction
The reorganization of Ordovician benthic marine communities

Examples of extant alpha diversity studies
High tree diversity in throughout the Amazon Rainforests of Ecuador

See also
 Beta diversity
 Dark diversity
 Diversity index
 Gamma diversity
 Zeta diversity
 Global biodiversity
 Measurement of biodiversity
 Phylogenetic diversity

References

External links
 An explanation of many specific biodiversity terms using illustrations, University of Wisconsin–Stevens Point

Biodiversity
Measurement of biodiversity
Summary statistics for categorical data
Ecology terminology